Sibusiso Bruno Matsenjwa (born 2 May 1988) is a sprinter from Eswatini. He competed in the 200 metres at the 2012 and 2016 Olympics, but failed to reach the finals. He broke the national record on both occasions and served as the flag bearer for Eswatini during the opening ceremony in 2016. Matsenjwa holds national records over 100–400 m distances. He represented his country at three outdoor and three indoor world championships. Sibusiso also competed at the 2018 Gold Coast Commonwealth Games.

He competed in the men's 200m at the 2020 Summer Olympics.

Competition record

1Disqualified in the semifinals

Personal bests
Outdoor
100 metres – 10.22 (+0.3 m/s, Réduit 2018, NR)
200 metres – 20.22 (+0.2 m/s, Tokyo 2021, NR)
400 metres – 46.79 (Pretoria 2018)
Indoor
60 metres – 6.82 (Birmingham 2018)

References

1988 births
Living people
Swazi male sprinters
Commonwealth Games competitors for Eswatini
Olympic athletes of Eswatini
Athletes (track and field) at the 2012 Summer Olympics
Athletes (track and field) at the 2016 Summer Olympics
Athletes (track and field) at the 2014 Commonwealth Games
Athletes (track and field) at the 2018 Commonwealth Games
Athletes (track and field) at the 2015 African Games
Athletes (track and field) at the 2019 African Games
World Athletics Championships athletes for Eswatini
Athletes (track and field) at the 2020 Summer Olympics
Competitors at the 2013 Summer Universiade
African Games competitors for Eswatini